Debaryomyces is a genus of yeasts in the family Saccharomycetaceae.

Species

D. artagaveytiae
D. carsonii
D. castellii
D. coudertii
D. etchellsii
D. globularis
D. hansenii
D. kloeckeri
D. kursanovii
D. marama
D. macquariensis
D. melissophilus
D. mrakii
D. mycophilus
D. nepalensis
D. occidentalis
D. oviformis
D. polymorphus
D. prosopidis
D. pseudopolymorphus
D. psychrosporus
D. robertsiae
D. singareniensis
D. udenii
D. vanrijiae
D. vietnamensis
D. vindobonensis
D. yamadae

References

Saccharomycetaceae
Yeasts
Osmophiles